Igreja do Santíssimo Milagre is a church in Portugal. It is classified as a National Monument.

Churches in Santarém District
National monuments in Santarém District